Zodarion minutum is a spider species found in Spain, Majorca and Ibiza.

See also 
 List of Zodariidae species

References

External links 

minutum
Spiders of Europe
Fauna of Mallorca
Spiders described in 1994